Székesfehérvári MÁV Előre Sport Club was a Hungarian football club from the town of Székesfehérvár, Hungary.

History
Székesfehérvári MÁV Előre Sport Club debuted in the 1977–78 season of the Hungarian League and finished 16th.

Name changes 
1909–1910: Székesfehérvári Déli Vasúti Testedző Kör
1910–1919: Székesfehérvári Déli Vasúti Műhelymunkások Testedző Köre
1919: merger with Székesfehérvári Előre Testgyakorló Kör
1919–1923: Székesfehérvári Déli Vasúti Testedző Kör
1923–1932: Székesfehérvári Duna-Száva-Adria Vasút Előre Testgyakorlók Köre
1932–1948: Székesfehérvári MÁV Előre Testedző Kör
1948–1949: Székesfehérvári Vasutas SE
1949–1955: Székesfehérvári Lokomotív Sport Kör
1955–1957: Székesfehérvári Törekvés SC
1957–1996:Székesfehérvári MÁV Előre SC

References

External links
 Profile

Football clubs in Hungary
Defunct football clubs in Hungary
1909 establishments in Hungary